Anisocerus is a genus of long-horned beetles in the family Cerambycidae. There are at least two described species in Anisocerus.

Species
These two species belong to the genus Anisocerus:
 Anisocerus scopifer (Germar, 1824)
 Anisocerus stellatus Guérin-Méneville, 1855

References

Further reading

External links

 

Cerambycidae